The Library Quarter, sometimes referred to as Scotch Quarter and Press Quarter, is the area of Belfast City Centre located around Belfast Central Library on Royal Avenue. The Library Quarter is bounded by Royal Avenue, Donegall Street, Carrick Hill and North Street. Other important occupiers of the area include two newspapers, the Belfast Telegraph and the Irish News.

Quarters of Belfast